Yang Zi-jun, also known as Jessica Yang (born February 8, 1990), is a former professional tennis player from Hong Kong. A member of the Hong Kong Fed Cup team (last match in 2012), she has a career-high ranking of No. 22 in the world in juniors.

Tennis career

Junior
She has reached the latter stages of many junior tournaments; she won the 2007 Girls Under-18 Toyota Open in Bangkok, Thailand, beating Khunpak Issara 6–3, 6–0.

In the 2008 Wimbledon girls' singles, where she just missed out on being seeded, she beat Anna Orlik of Belarus, 6–2, 6–1. Her run was halted in the second round when she was beaten by junior world No. 3, Arantxa Rus, 6–3, 6–0.

Professional years
Her best performance in a professional tournament is reaching the second round of various tournaments; the Bangkok tournament in 2006, where she lost to Thassha Vitayaviroj; at another tournament in Bangkok in 2006, as a qualifier, she lost to Lee Jin-a; in Jakarta in 2006 where she lost to Lavinia Tananta, and the 2008 tournament in Bulungan where she lost in the 2nd round to second seed Liang Chen. All the tournaments are $10,000 tier tournaments, the lowest category of the ITF Women's Circuit.

ITF finals

Singles (1–0)

Doubles (1–3)

References

External links
 

1990 births
Living people
Hong Kong female tennis players